Kate Scott Turner (March 12, 1831 in Cooperstown, New York – 1917) was an American poet and a friend of poetess Emily Dickinson. She was also known as Kate Anthon.

Overview
Catherine Mary ("Kate") Scott was the daughter of Henry Scott of Cooperstown, New York. She attended the Utica Female Seminary, where in 1848 she met Susan Gilbert, who married Emily Dickinson's brother Austin Dickinson. The women remained friends until Susan's death in 1913.

In 1855, she married Campbell Ladd Turner, who died in 1857 of tuberculosis. Turner was acquainted with Emily Dickinson through Susan, and they remained so until the mid-1860s. Turner married for a second time in 1866 to John Hone Anthon, who died eight years later. She died in 1917 in England, having lived most of her life outside of the United States.

Emily Dickinson
She met Emily Dickinson in 1859. From that time until about 1862, Dickinson sent her four poems. One poem was sent with a pair of garters that Dickinson had knitted for her:

References

Further reading

External links
 Dickinson / Anthon Correspondence and Poems, Dickinson Electronic Archives

1831 births
1917 deaths
19th-century American poets
19th-century American women writers
American women poets
Emily Dickinson
Poets from New York (state)
People from Cooperstown, New York